The Buford School Building is a historic school building on Arkansas Highway 126 in Buford, Arkansas.  It is a single-story Plain Traditional structure with Craftsman touches, built in 1936 with funding from the Works Progress Administration.  It is fashioned out of mortared gray limestone, with a metal roof and a concrete foundation.  The main (east-facing) facade has a projecting gabled porch, supported by concrete piers.  The roof is decorated with rafter ends and knee brackets.  The building was used as a school until 1960, and has afterward seen other uses, including as a community center.

The building was listed on the National Register of Historic Places in 1992.

See also
National Register of Historic Places listings in Baxter County, Arkansas

References

School buildings on the National Register of Historic Places in Arkansas
National Register of Historic Places in Baxter County, Arkansas
Schools in Baxter County, Arkansas
1936 establishments in Arkansas
School buildings completed in 1936
Bungalow architecture in Arkansas
American Craftsman architecture in Arkansas
Educational institutions disestablished in 1960
Works Progress Administration in Arkansas